Barbara Neski (née Goldberg; born in 1928) is an American architect who co-founded the architectural firm Neski Associates with her husband Julian Neski in New York City.

Education 
Neski grew up in Highland Park, New Jersey. She received her undergraduate degree from Bennington College in 1949. During her third semester of her undergraduate studies she became aware of the nearby Robinson House in Williamstown, Massachusetts designed by Marcel Breuer and was inspired by what domestic architecture could be. She received her Master of Architecture from Harvard University's Graduate School of Design that was at the time directed by Walter Gropius. She finished the three-year program in two years and found being a woman in the program an “oddity.” One professor, Hugh Stubbins, did not take her seriously and during desk crits would completely “ignore [her]”. “He didn’t even look at [her] drawings.”

Early career 
In 1952 Neski began working in the office of José Luis Sert. She worked on urban plans for Bogotá and Havana. She met Julian Neski while working at Sert's office, her future design partner and husband. They were married in 1954. They moved to Marcel Breuer's office where she designed plans for a factory in Canada, a house in Connecticut, and a library for Hunter College. In 1959, they collaborated on the American National Exhibition in Moscow with an American design team that included Peter Blake, Buckminster Fuller, Charles and Ray Eames.

Neski Associates 
They started their firm in the early 1960s and designed over 35 houses, 25 of which were in the Hamptons, NY. Their practice was one of equals with both fully participating in all aspects of the practice. Their practice became known for their modernist vacation homes. The Neski's maintained a small office in part to be able to better manage all aspects of the work, having a direct hand in each project. Barbara Neski taught at Pratt Institute between 1978 and 1992. She became a Fellow of the American Institute of Architects in 1985.

Selected works 

 Cates House, Amagansett, NY, 1968
 Chalif House, East Hampton, NY, 1964
 Sabel House, Bridgehampton, NY 1970
 Simon House, Remensberg, 1972
 Tivoli Towers housing complex, Brooklyn, NY 1973
 Formby House, 1980
 Foundation Center, New York, NY, 1985

Bibliography 
GA Houses 13, 1983, ADA Edita Tokyo

External links 
http://atom.prattsi.org/index.php/julian-and-barbara-neski-2

References 

1928 births
Bennington College alumni
Harvard Graduate School of Design alumni
Living people
Architects from New York City
American women architects
Fellows of the American Institute of Architects
Pratt Institute faculty
People from Highland Park, New Jersey
21st-century American women